GP-1: Part II, known in Japan as  is a motorcycle racing game developed by Genki and published by Atlus for the SNES, which was released in 1994. It is a sequel to GP-1.

Gameplay

In GP-1 Part II, players must control a motorcycle, making turns without leaving the track. The game features three game modes: "GP Race" which is present along with a "Practice" and "Race" mode, "Time Attack" which is a race against the clock, and "Vs Battle" which is a standard two player competitive mode. AI racers do not compete in "Vs Battle" mode.

The Japanese version uses a battery-backed save, while the North American version uses a password save.

GP Race mode is a kind of career/season mode, where the player competes to earn a place on the podium. The Japanese version begins with a qualifying round in Japan, consisting of four local tracks, followed by the GP-1 World Championship (featuring all 14 circuits of the real-life 1994 Grand Prix motorcycle racing season). The North American version omits the preliminary round and goes straight to the world championship. At the Japanese qualifying round there are only three available motorcycles. In the world championship another three motorcycles are available.

In the world championship, the player races against racers from around the world in 14 tracks. Rival racers will intimidate and challenge the player to bet a few bucks to see who arrives before the race, but betting is optional. The money earned from rivals or winning races can be used to upgrade the motorcycle. Earning enough points will let the player obtain better parts for their bike.

Tracks

Japanese Championship
 View Sight (Fuji)

 Mountain (Sugo)

 Twin Head (Tsukuba)

 Japan (Suzuka; also Round 3 of the World Championship)

World Championship
  Australia (Eastern Creek)
  Malaysia (Shah Alam Circuit)
  Japan (Suzuka)
  Spain (Jerez)
  Austria (Salzburgring)
  Germany (Hockenheimring)
  Netherlands (Assen)
  Italy (Mugello)
  France (Le Mans)
  Great Britain (Donington Park)
  Czech Republic (Brno)
  United States (Laguna Seca)
  Argentina (Autódromo Juan y Oscar Gálvez)
  Europe (Circuit de Barcelona-Catalunya)

Reception
In their review, GamePro commented that though GP-1 Part II features some improvements over the original, such as more tracks, it drops many of the touches that made the original a standout game, making it an overall decent but nondescript title with nothing to make consumers choose it over the many other racing games on the market.

See also
 Racing Damashii
 Bari Bari Densetsu

Notes

References

External links
 
 GP-1: Part II at MobyGames
 GP-1 - Rapid Stream at superfamicom.org
 GP-1 RS at super-famicom.jp 

1994 video games
Atlus games
Genki (company) games
Motorcycle video games
Racing video games
Super Nintendo Entertainment System games
Super Nintendo Entertainment System-only games
Video games developed in Japan
Video game sequels
Video games set in Japan
Grand Prix motorcycle racing
Multiplayer and single-player video games